Penn Medicine Rittenhouse is a rehabilitation and long-term acute-care facility in the Southwest Center City neighborhood of Philadelphia founded in 2007. The current facility is owned by the University of Pennsylvania Health System (UPHS) and operated by Good Shepherd Penn Partners.

The space was formerly occupied by the Graduate Hospital, which opened in 1916, though medical care originally began on the site in 1889 under the name Philadelphia Polyclinic.

History
The origins of the hospital are with the Philadelphia Polyclinic, founded in 1889 in the area of 20th and South Streets in Philadelphia. In 1916, the University of Pennsylvania Graduate School of Medicine established Graduate Hospital as a clinical teaching facility. The hospital was spun off as an independent, non-profit hospital in 1977 after losing money for several years. The hospital was a member of Pittsburgh's Allegheny Health System from 1996 until 1998, when the company went bankrupt, and was part of Tenet Healthcare from 1998 to 2007, when it finally sold back to the University of Pennsylvania Health System and in 2006 it sought to sell this and two other Philadelphia hospitals. At this point, Penn Medicine closed the facility as a full-service hospital and converted it to a specialty medical facility.

Facilities
The main campus, part of the Penn Medicine Institute for Rehabilitation Medicine, is a 58-bed inpatient rehabilitation facility operated by Good Shepherd Penn Partners. The second building, known as the Tuttleman Center, houses a 37-bed outpatient ambulatory surgical center and a radiology department.

References

External links
 Penn Medicine Rittenhouse
 Tuttleman Center
 Good Shepherd Rehabilitation Network

Hospital buildings completed in 1916
Hospitals in Pennsylvania
Perelman School of Medicine at the University of Pennsylvania
Southwest Center City, Philadelphia